Old Denton is a historic home and farm complex located near The Plains, Fauquier County, Virginia.  The property includes a two-story, brick-masonry main dwelling (c. 1860), a secondary dwelling (c. 1820), a meat house (c. 1860), a stable (c. 1936), a tenant house (c. 1950), three early- 20th-century dry-laid stone walls, and an early-20th-century pump. The house features a one-story, negatively sloped, three-bay, classically inspired, Greek Doric order front porch.

It was listed on the National Register of Historic Places in 2012.

References

Houses on the National Register of Historic Places in Virginia
Houses completed in 1860
Houses in Fauquier County, Virginia
National Register of Historic Places in Fauquier County, Virginia